"( )" or two parentheses (40 and 41 in ASCII) may refer to:
 Function prototype, no arguments or unknown arguments, in some programming languages
 The empty list or tuple in some programming languages
 The unit type in the Haskell programming language
 (album), a 2002 album by Sigur Rós
 (film), a 2003 short film directed by Morgan Fisher
 A hug, in emoticon
 The stage name of Kim Carlsson, a member of the Swedish black metal band Lifelover

See also 
 Parenthesis (disambiguation)